Mordellistena apiciventris is a beetle in the genus Mordellistena of the family Mordellidae. It was described in 1931 by Píc.

References

apiciventris
Beetles described in 1931